Nebria lacustris, also known as the lacustrine gazelle beetle, is a species of ground beetle in the Nebriinae subfamily that can be found in southern Canada and in the US states such as Tennessee and Wisconsin. One of such species was found in Great Smoky Mountains National Park. Adults can move quickly, and are nocturnally active.

References

lacustris
Beetles described in 1913
Beetles of North America